Acleris caledoniana, the Caledonian button, is a species of moth of the family Tortricidae. It is found in Ireland, Great Britain and Poland. It is found in high moorland, where it inhabits mountain bogs.

The wingspan is 13–15 mm. Very similar to Acleris comariana and Acleris laterana. Certain identification requires examination of the genitalia. Julius von Kennel provides  a  description 

Adults are on wing from July to September. It is a day-flying species.

The larvae feed on Alchemilla alpina, Myrica gale, Vaccinium myrtillus, Rubus and Potentilla species. They spin together the leaves or shoots of their host plant, feeding from within. Larvae can be found from June to July.

References

	

Moths described in 1852
caledoniana
Moths of Europe